The Tornado outbreak of January 17–18, 1999 was the second of three major tornado outbreaks in January 1999. It was followed several days later by the largest January outbreak on record.

Confirmed tornadoes

January 17 event

January 18 event

See also
List of North American tornadoes and tornado outbreaks
January 21–23, 1999 tornado outbreak

References

Tornadoes of 1999
F4 tornadoes by date
Tornadoes in Arkansas
Tornadoes in Mississippi
Tornadoes in Pennsylvania
Tornadoes in Tennessee
 ,1999-01-17
1999 in Arkansas
1999 in Mississippi
1999 in Pennsylvania
1999 in Tennessee
January 1999 events in the United States